Baldwin Hills Crenshaw Plaza (alternately BHCP) is a shopping mall  located in the Baldwin Hills neighborhood of Los Angeles, California. This was one of the first regional shopping centers in the United States built specifically for the automobile. Two anchor buildings, completed in 1947, retain their original Streamline Moderne style. Since the mid-1960s, the mall has become a major economic and cultural hub of surrounding African American communities which include a spectrum of socioeconomic classes.

Its remaining anchor stores are Macy's and TJ Maxx after the closure of Sears and Walmart. An additional net  of new development was approved by the city in 2018. The approved plan includes apartments, condominiums, a 400-room hotel, office space and additional stores. The mall has been seeking a buyer who would build out the approved plan. The sale has been challenged  with community protests including a group of neighborhood activists who made a play to acquire the property and develop it as a community-owned project. In 2021,  Harridge Development Group bought the mall for about $111 million.

History

Broadway-Crenshaw Center 
The Broadway-Crenshaw Center was the first post-WWII open-air retail complex in the state of California. It was one of the first regional shopping centers in the United States built specifically for the automobile. The Broadway Building, designed by Albert B. Gardner, is excellent example of Streamline Moderne architecture. Loading was done below ground via an underground service tunnel stretching the length of the property.

Silverwoods opened April 8, 1949, in size, Albert B. Gardener, architect. More retail stores were added to the complex in the early 1950s and mid 1960s, including a Desmond's department store. A bridge was built across MLK Boulevard (Santa Barbara Avenue at the time) to the north, to the May Company building that had opened on October 10, 1947. The building, although constructed by different parties, is also an excellent example of the Streamline Moderne architecture. The entire  block became part of the mall property.

Major expansion 
Renamed Baldwin Hills Crenshaw Plaza, the new indoor shopping complex opened its doors to the public with a grand opening ceremony in November 1989 by Los Angeles mayor Tom Bradley who wanted to see a major shopping center in the neighborhood.

The shopping complex had undergone a massive renovation that started in mid-1986. Much of the original building was demolished. A two-level, enclosed regional shopping mall structure was built in its place and included a new Sears as the third anchor. The Broadway and May Company anchor stores were connected with a covered pedestrian bridge over Santa Barbara Avenue. The original May Company building became Robinsons-May in 1993.

On July 12, 1995, the first Magic Johnson Theatres opened as a 15-screen cinema complex. The grand opening featured many well-known celebrity guest such as then Los Angeles Mayor Richard Riordan and others. The original Broadway building became a Macy's in 1996 which closed 3 years later and became a three-story Walmart store in 2001. Lucky's supermarket became an Albertsons in mid-1999 after being purchased by the grocer.

Capri Capital Partners
In early 2005, global investors Capri Capital Partners purchased the shopping mall. In September 2006, the Robinsons-May store rebranded as Macy's, making its second entry to the mall after a 7-year hiatus since the first store closure in 1999. In 2010, the mall owners added a new interior embellishments, a modern and larger food court on the first level. Capri has also redesigned the theme Baldwin Hills Crenshaw Bridge to a glass see-through bridge overlooking Crenshaw Boulevard and Martin Luther King Jr. Boulevard. The windows created a meeting space for events such as various classes, Taste of Soul auditions, and an exercise program for senior citizens. There was also new paint jobs to the Macy's and the now-closed Walmart historical buildings were painted from peach to bright white. New tenants with and after the second renovation included a new Cinemark XD Extreme multiplex cinema, Pink, Victoria's Secret, Forever 21 and Lane Bryant. New restaurants included Post & Beam, Chipotle Mexican Grill and Buffalo Wild Wings.  The first phase of renovation was officially completed in November 2011. The original Broadway building which had become a Walmart in 2001, closed on January 17, 2016. On November 7, 2019, it was announced that Sears would be closing this location a part of a plan to close 96 stores nationwide. The store closed in February 2020, leaving Macy's as the mall's only traditional anchor.

Mixed-use approval
In 2017, a draft EIR was processed. With city council in 2018, the site received entitlements to transform the shopping mall into a 24-hour mixed-use complex with commercial, office and residential structures. The expansion on the  site would include: a luxury 400-room hotel and resort, an office tower with a penthouse level, an open-air plaza, mid to high upscale restaurants, acres of public space, a multi-story parking structure and residential units with low-rise condominiums and apartments.

In April 2020, CIM Group agreed to buy the mall for more than $100 million with plans to convert the former Sears and Walmart into offices to drive more foot traffic into the remaining retail stores. There was strong community opposition to their plans which did not include the residential component and the sale was cancelled in June 2020. The mall was closed for much of 2020 due to the COVID-19 pandemic. A sale to LIVWRK and DFH Partners had been expected to close before the end of 2020. During the transition to a new owner, community leaders and groups have expressed concern about African American ownership and participation in the project. The mall has been seeking a buyer who would build out the approved plan but the sale to LIVWRK and DFH Partners was scuttled in December 2020 after meeting with community protests. A local group called Downtown Crenshaw made an offer to purchase the mall through a community land trust but has been turned down. With the assistance of experienced architecture firms, they created a plan that included affordable housing, a healthcare clinic, child care, satellite campuses for job training, conference spaces, and Black art spaces. The group continues to advocate for community based ownership of the mall. An offer from Harridge Development Group for about $111 million was accepted in 2021. They also bought the Macy's department store building in a separate transaction of more than $30 million which gave Harridge control of almost the entire  site that straddles Martin Luther King Jr. Boulevard.

In 2021, developer speaks out about sale of Baldwin Hills Crenshaw Plaza. He was breaking his silence on the recent sale of the Baldwin Hills Crenshaw Plaza and said that "Historically, systems and institutions have not engaged with the Black community in ways that have been fair to the Black community." Gross and his group of investors have offered $110 million to acquire the shopping center, defining that this mall Gross considers dear to his heart because due to a fact in the community he has grew up in.

In January 2023, Macy's announced that the store at center would close sometime in 2023. This will leave the mall with no traditional anchors left.

Neighborhood
As African Americans began moving to the Crenshaw District and Baldwin Hills in the mid-1960s, the mall has been a major economic and cultural hub of the African American community of a spectrum of socioeconomic classes with a Black Santa Claus and dozens of minority-owned businesses are tenants. In 1976, May Company offered space to the Museum of African American Art on the third floor of what later became Macy's. Samella Lewis, who had founded the museum in 1975, wanted "to provide art services to students, scholars, teachers and lay persons concerned with the art and cultural history of the peoples of the African Diaspora."

The mall has hosted the Leimert Park Book Fair since it began in 2007. The theaters in the mall have screened movies for many of the annual Pan African Film Festival.

The area is becoming more ethnically diverse and gentrified, through redevelopment within the immediate neighborhood and the South Los Angeles area, spurred by the plans for the K Line light rail. Martin Luther King Jr. underground station serves the shopping center and the adjacent Kaiser Permanente medical facility at Marlton Square. It opened in 2022.

References

External links

 Metro Rail: Martin Luther King Jr Station

Buildings and structures in Los Angeles
Baldwin Hills, Los Angeles
Shopping malls in Central Los Angeles
Crenshaw, Los Angeles
Shopping malls established in 1947
1947 establishments in California